Stranraer railway station (formerly  known as Stranraer Harbour railway station) is a railway station that serves the town of Stranraer, Dumfries and Galloway, Scotland. The station is 94.5 miles (151 km) southwest of Glasgow and is the terminus of the Glasgow South Western Line. It has two platforms (although only one of these is currently in use) and is staffed on a part-time basis.

The station is located on the east pier of Stranraer Harbour, formerly used by ferry services to Northern Ireland.

History

The station was opened on 1 October 1862 by the Portpatrick Railway; however, the current station buildings date from 1877 under the Portpatrick Railways Act 1877. The original facility was a concrete platform. Passengers and mail were meant to use the station at Portpatrick. The Portpatrick ferry service was never successful as, despite its apparently attractive location and significant initial investment, the harbour there was unsuitable as it was too small and insufficiently sheltered.

A ferry service had commenced by 1861 but passengers made their way from Stranraer Town station to the steamers, not Stranraer Harbour station. However, it only lasted until 31 December 1863. Originally named Stranraer Harbour, the station name was simplified to Stranraer by 1996.

The Stena Line ferry service to Larne was moved to Belfast on 12 November 1995. P&O Ferries still sails there from nearby Cairnryan. Stena stopped serving Stranraer on 21 November 2011, having invested £200 million on a new route to Loch Ryan Port, near Cairnryan. ScotRail has cut services to Stranraer since the ferry services started departing from further up Loch Ryan and ferry passengers who travel by rail now face a long journey to Ayr by bus (called "RailSail", though it uses neither rails nor sails).

The line that runs from Stranraer station was temporarily closed between August and November 2018 due to the closures of platform 3 and 4 of Ayr station. This was caused by the adjacent hotel building that was found to be structurally unsound, which was then subsequently secured and services then resumed.

Services

Pre-COVID
On Sundays, five trains per day operate to/from Ayr where passengers can change for connections to Glasgow.

Services 2022
7 days a week, There is a daily service of 5 trains per day to Ayr, running to an irregular 2 to 4 hourly frequency, 2 of these trains extend to Kilmarnock and one continues to Glasgow. On Sundays, All trains terminate at Ayr

Bus link to Cairnryan ferry terminals
In September 2013 a bus link, route 350 operated by McLeans, was introduced between the railway station and the P&O Ferries and Stena Line ferry terminals at Cairnryan. The bus also serves the centre of Stranraer. Note this service meets all trains but does not operate on Sundays. As of 2017 the 350 service was rerouted and no longer calls at Stranraer station.

Future
The station is the southern terminal of the South West Scotland Community Rail Partnership which comprises local Community Councils, representation from South Ayrshire Council, ScotRail as well as private individuals.  SWSCRP has adopted the station and has provided tubs, shrubs and plants.  These are tended to by South West Scotland Station Adopters Gardening Group.

Plans by Dumfries & Galloway Council, to close the station and replace it by a new structure a few hundred metres further east to create a new transport hub for Stranraer have been ditched and the ring-fenced money used on other projects. On 21 November 2011, Stena Line operations ceased at Stranraer and were transferred a few miles up Loch Ryan to Cairnryan.

See also
Stranraer Town railway station

References

Notes

Sources

External links

 Video and narration on Stranraer (Harbour) Railway Station.
 Photographic record of Stranraer (harbour) railway station and approach.
 A train at Stranraer Harbour Station

Railway stations in Dumfries and Galloway
Former Portpatrick and Wigtownshire Joint Railway stations
Railway stations in Great Britain opened in 1862
Railway stations serving harbours and ports in the United Kingdom
Railway stations served by ScotRail
Stranraer
1862 establishments in Scotland